The 24th National Television Awards were held at The O2 Arena on 22 January 2019 and were the last to be hosted by Dermot O'Leary. Jack Fincham and Dani Dyer were on backstage duties. On 13 February 2019, O'Leary announced he was leaving the programme after nine years.

Performances
John Barrowman ("temporary replacement" for Dermot O'Leary during the opening number) – "Fabulous"
Westlife – "Hello My Love"

Awards
The full list of shortlisted nominations was announced on 7 January 2019.

Programmes with multiple nominations

Programmes with multiple wins

References

External links
The National Television Awards official website
The O2 official website

National Television Awards
N
2019 in British television
N
National
National Television Awards